Krutskikh is a Russian surname. Notable people with the surname include:

 Daniil Krutskikh (born 2000), Russian sailor
 Diana Krutskikh (born 1977), Russian sailor
 Vladimir Krutskikh (born 1973), Russian sailor

See also
 

Russian-language surnames